Leaf River (French: Rivière aux Feuilles; Inuktitut: Kuugaaluk ["the large river"] or Itinniq ["where there are spring tides"]) is a river in northern Quebec, Canada, at the northern limit of the tree line. At the head of Leaf Bay is the Inuit community of Tasiujaq.

With caution, it is possible to paddle the entire Leaf River without portaging, as it contains no impassable waterfalls or non-navigable rapids.

The river is ice-free for about 60 days each year.

Tributaries
The significant tributaries of the Leaf River are:
 Charpentier River
 Nedlouc River
 Descareaux River
 Daunais River
 Goudalie River
 Vizien River
 Brissard River
 Qijuttuuk River
 Cohade River
 Tuktu River
 Dufreboy Creek
 Viennaux River
 Papijjusaq River
 Peladeau River
 Fanfan River

History 
Since at least the late 19th century, the river has been known by its English name, "Leaf River", which was probably derived from the Arctic willow and birch trees that grow sparsely along its banks. The Hudson's Bay Company fished there for salmon and porpoises, and opened a trading post at the mouth of the river around 1905. In the early 20th century, the French name Rivière des Feuilles was assigned, and standardized to its current form Rivière aux Feuilles in 1925.

First known explorers:
1898 - Albert Peter Low
1912 - Robert J. Flaherty
1976 - Bob Davis

The Leaf River caribou herd 

The Leaf River caribou herd (LRCH) is a migratory forest-tundra ecotype of the boreal population, a caribou subspecies of Rangifer tarandus caribou. Like the George River Herd, it migrates between forest and tundra. Migratory caribou herds are often defined in terms of female natal philopatry or natal homing, the tendency to return to natal calving areas—in this case, the Leaf River. The Leaf Herd in the west, near the coast of Hudson Bay, increased from 270,000 in 1991 to 628,000 in 2001. According to the Quebec's Natural Resources and Wildlife survey, the Leaf River Herd (LRH) (Rivière-aux-Feuilles) had decreased to 430,000 caribou in 2011. According to an international study on caribou populations, the Leaf River herd could be threatened with extinction by 2080.

References

External links

 Tides on Leaf Basin, Quebec
 Leaf Bay 7 day tidal predictions, Fisheries and Oceans Canada

Rivers of Nord-du-Québec
Hudson's Bay Company trading posts